David Vladimirovich Musulbes (also transliterated Musuľbes, born 28 May 1972 in Ordzhonikidze, North Ossetian ASSR) is a retired Russian wrestler of Georgian origin who competed for Russia and later represented Slovakia.

He is the 2000 Summer Olympics winner in freestyle 130 kg, the 2001 and 2002 World Champion in freestyle 120 kg.

In 2007, he gained Slovak citizenship and represented Slovakia at the 2008 Summer Olympics, winning the bronze medal in freestyle 120 kg. After Artur Taymazov, who defeated Musulbes in semifinals, was positively tested for banned substance in his urine sample and disqualified, Musulbes moved to second place and silver medal.

Musulbes lives in Moscow, where he is the director of the Moscow Secondary Special Olympic Reserve School No. 1.

References

External links 
 
 
 
 

1972 births
Living people
Russian male sport wrestlers
Slovak male sport wrestlers
Olympic wrestlers of Russia
Olympic wrestlers of Slovakia
Olympic gold medalists for Russia
Olympic silver medalists for Slovakia
Olympic medalists in wrestling
Wrestlers at the 2000 Summer Olympics
Wrestlers at the 2008 Summer Olympics
Medalists at the 2000 Summer Olympics
Medalists at the 2008 Summer Olympics
Sportspeople from Vladikavkaz
World Wrestling Championships medalists